Sanjay Gautam is a member of the 2nd Nepalese Constituent Assembly. He won the Bardiya–2 seat in Nepalese Constituent Assembly election, 2013 from the Nepali Congress.

External links 
 Sanjay Gautam on Facebook
 Sanjay Gautam on Instagram
 Sanjay Gautam on Twitter

References

Living people
Year of birth missing (living people)
Members of the Nepalese Constituent Assembly